The following is a list of indoor arenas in Slovenia, ordered by a seating capacity. The venues are by their final capacity after construction for seating-only events. There is more capacity if standing room is included (e.g. for concerts). All venues with at least 2,000 seats are listed.

Current arenas

See also 
List of indoor arenas in Europe
List of indoor arenas by capacity

References

 
Slovenia
Indoor arenas